Flinck is a surname. Notable people with the surname include:

 Govert Flinck (1615–1660), Dutch painter
 Markku Flinck (born 1985), Finnish ice hockey player
 Thorsten Flinck (born 1961), Swedish actor, director, and musician
 Anni Flinck (1915–1990), Finnish politician

See also
 Finck